AH Competições (previously known as WB Motorsport) is a Brazilian auto racing team founded in 1996 by Stock Car Brasil co-founder Washington Bezerra and former racing driver Wilson Fittipaldi. The team won the championship in Stock Car Brasil, Stock Car Light and Brazilian GT Championship. In 2010 the team was renamed for AH Competições with former racing driver Antonio Hermann became the team owner alongside Bezerra. In 2013 the team joined FIA GT Series with BMW under the name BMW Sports Trophy Team Brasil.

References

External links
 

Brazilian auto racing teams
1996 establishments in Brazil
Stock Car Brasil teams
Blancpain Endurance Series teams

Auto racing teams established in 1996